Uchan may refer to:
 Owchan, a village in Iran
 Uchen script